Lee Patrick Thomas "Skip" Pitlock (born November 6, 1947) is an American former Major League Baseball pitcher. A left-hander noted for his unusual wind-up, he had a "herky-jerky" motion which deceived major league batters, and led to 124 career strikeouts in 192 innings pitched.

Early years
Pitlock was born in Hillside, Illinois, and attended Immaculate Conception High School in Elmhurst, Illinois. Drafted by the San Francisco Giants in the eleventh round of the 1969 Major League Baseball draft out of Southern Illinois University, Pitlock went 10-2 with a 2.20 earned run average in his first professional season with the Pioneer League Great Falls Giants and California League Fresno Giants to jump all the way to triple A for his sophomore season.

San Francisco Giants
Just about a year to the day after signing with the Giants, Pitlock earned his first call to the major leagues in June, . Starting against Bob Gibson and the St. Louis Cardinals, Pitlock was tagged for four runs in the first three innings and took the loss in his major league debut. His finest performance was a complete game victory on August 3 against the Los Angeles Dodgers, in which he allowed two unearned runs on four hits and two walks while striking out nine. For the season, Pitlock went 5–5 with a 4.66 ERA in fifteen starts. He also made thirteen starts for the Phoenix Giants, going 10–3 with a 2.46 ERA.

He spent the next two seasons with Phoenix, going a combined 15–21 with a 4.93 ERA. He was traded from the Giants to the Chicago White Sox for Chuck Hartenstein and Glenn Redmon on February 8, .

Chicago White Sox
He earned a job in Chicago's bullpen out of spring training , going 2–2 with a 4.01 ERA in 35 relief appearances, and earning his only career save on June 19 against the Cleveland Indians. He also made five starts, going 1–1 with a 6.20 ERA.

He was 4–1 with a 3.91 ERA for the Denver Bears mostly in relief. He was dealt along with Stan Bahnsen from the White Sox to the Oakland Athletics for Dave Hamilton and Chet Lemon at the non-waiver trade deadline on June 15, .

Upon his acquisition by the A's, he was assigned to the Pacific Coast League's Tucson Toros, and converted back into a starter. He spent one more season as a minor leaguer before retiring.

Career stats

A below average fielder and hitter, Pitlock committed four errors in 1974, and struck out eighteen times in 25 career at-bats. His one career home run came on August 8, 1970 against Wade Blasingame of the Houston Astros.

References

External links

1947 births
Living people
Baseball players from Illinois
Chicago White Sox players
Denver Bears players
Fresno Giants players
Great Falls Giants players
Iowa Oaks players
Major League Baseball pitchers
Phoenix Giants players
Salt Lake City Gulls players
San Francisco Giants players
Southern Illinois Salukis baseball players
Sportspeople from Cook County, Illinois
Tucson Toros players